Laëtitia Choux (born 23 September 1979) is a French former swimmer who competed in the 1996 Summer Olympics and in the 2000 Summer Olympics.

References

1979 births
Living people
Sportspeople from Épinal
French female freestyle swimmers
Olympic swimmers of France
Swimmers at the 1996 Summer Olympics
Swimmers at the 2000 Summer Olympics
European Aquatics Championships medalists in swimming